Cole Sax is an American film director and producer. He has directed films such as World Debut, executive produced by Tony Hawk, a sports documentary about how the skateboarding, surfing, and climbing subcultures eventually made their way to the Olympics.

Sax's 2018 documentary series Far From Home, produced for the Olympic Channel and Snapchat, won three Telly Awards, including Gold in video web-series. Additionally, his short documentary film Second Sight won the Norman Vaughan Indomitable Spirit Award at the 47th Telluride Film Festival, and also a silver for directing at the Telly Awards.

Early life and education
Sax was born and raised in Atlanta, Georgia, but started his filmmaking education at a young age when he moved to Park City, Utah. He attended Park City High School and the New York Film Academy in Los Angeles, California. He then attended the University of California, Berkeley and the University of Utah. He also attended Park City Academy with filmmaker Bruno Kohfield-Galeano.

Career
Sax began his career when he was 16 while working for InSync Plus, a motion picture company in Los Angeles. When he was 18, he won his first Clio Key Art Award for the TV spot he edited for the feature film, The Art of Getting By. After his short documentary film 88 and Sunny screened at the Metropolitan Pavilion red-carpet gala for the 20th anniversary of the September 11 attacks, Sax went on to pursue directing in the unscripted space.

Sax has directed films in various parts of the world, including Malaysia, India, the Philippines, and Argentina. He has produced documentaries and content for the Olympic Channel, YouTube Originals, Snapchat, Nike, Facebook, and many others. Sax has also received the Mountainfilm Spirit Award for his documentary work.

Together with Boardwalk Pictures, Sax directed and produced the 2018 documentary series Far From Home, which features athletes trying to get to the Olympic Games. Additionally, Sax has given a talk at TEDx in 2018 titled "An Unlikely Hero" and has conducted filmmaking workshops at U.S. embassies in various countries. He has also worked together with organizations such as the Obama Foundation and Khan Academy to produce documentaries such as Dear Class of 2020, a 2020 YouTube Originals film that has been nominated for the Emmy Awards.

In 2021, Sax completed his debut feature documentary film World Debut for YouTube Originals, which documents the stories of skateboarders, surfers, and climbers as they try to make their way to the Olympic Games.

Personal life
Sax is currently based in both Salt Lake City, Utah and Los Angeles, California.

Awards and honors
Cole Sax's awards  include:

Filmography
Cole Sax's filmography:

References

External links

Living people
American film directors
American film producers
Year of birth missing (living people)